Wake Up and Dream is a science fiction novel by Ian R. MacLeod. The novel is set in an alternate version of the 1940s, where "feelies", a form of cinema that allows the audience to directly experience the emotions of the characters, are a primary form of entertainment, putting actors such as Clark Gable, the protagonist, out of work. This alternate Gable finds work as a Chandlerian private detective who uncovers a plot to use the feelies to turn the American public's attention away from the Second World War.

Editions
In addition to the trade hardcover, there was a signed, slipcased, limited edition of 100 copies produced with an ISBN of 978-1-84863-195-3. Also, purchasers of books from the PS Publishing table at Eastercon 2011 would receive a free chapbook, "Hector Douglas Makes A Sale" containing the story of the same name by MacLeod, along with a short afterword on the origins of the story and the novel and the links between the two. In 2013, Wake Up and Dream was published as an e-book by Open Road Media.

Literary significance and reception
Eric Brown, writing in The Guardian, received the novel favorably, adding that it was strong enough to win the Arthur C. Clarke Award. 
Publishers Weekly praised MacLeod's eye for detail and dialogue skills, concluding that MacLeod "expertly hits all the hard-boiled beats".

The novel won the Sidewise Award for Alternate History, Long Form in 2011.

References

External links

2011 British novels
2011 science fiction novels
British alternative history novels
Sidewise Award for Alternate History winning works
Novels about World War II alternate histories